Henry Slicer (March 27, 1801 – April 23, 1874) was an American Methodist minister who served as Chaplain of the Senate for three separate terms.

Early years

Henry Slicer was born on March 27, 1801 in Annapolis, Maryland, the son of Andrew Slicer and Elizabeth Selby.  During his youth he worked for a time as a painter of furniture while he studied for the ministry. He was licensed to preach in December 1821, by the Methodist church.

Ministry

Slicer served pastorates at the Harford circuit (1821) and then the Redstone circuit (1823), west of the Allegheny Mountains.  Then he was assigned to the Ebenezer Station in Washington, D.C. at the Naval Yard (1824).  In 1837 he was elected to serve as Chaplain of the Senate, a post to which he would again be elected in 1847 and 1853.

The unfortunate duel on February 24, 1838, at the Bladensburg dueling grounds, between two Congressmen, Jonathan Cilley and William J. Graves, resulting in Cilley’s death, brought forth a sermon by Slicer that greatly influenced Congressional legislation banning dueling in the District of Columbia.

He served at Georgetown and went to Carlisle, Pennsylvania in 1846.  Following his third term as Senate Chaplain he served in Baltimore and in Frederick, Maryland.  Slicer served as chaplain of the Seaman’s Chapel (1862–1870) in Baltimore. In 1870, he was appointed presiding elder of the Baltimore district. He died on April 23, 1874.

Personal life

On April 3, 1827 in Baltimore, Slicer married Elizabeth (“Eliza”)  C. Roberts. They had two daughters: Julia (b. 1836) and Sarah (b. 1847).  Their three sons were George, Henry and Thomas Slicer.

References

1801 births
1874 deaths
Chaplains of the United States Senate
American Methodist clergy
19th-century Methodists
19th-century American clergy